Kulichki is a rural locality (a khutor) in Rodnichkovskoye Rural Settlement, Nekhayevsky District, Volgograd Oblast, Russia. The population was 88 as of 2010. There are 4 streets.

Geography 
Kulichki is located on Kalach Upland, 47 km south of Nekhayevskaya (the district's administrative centre) by road. Rodnichki is the nearest rural locality.

References 

Rural localities in Nekhayevsky District